Laurel magnolia is a common name for several plants and may refer to:

Magnolia grandiflora, native to the southeastern United States
Magnolia splendens, native to Puerto Rico
Magnolia virginiana, native to the southeastern United States